Harungana is a genus of African flowering plants within the St. Johnswort family, Hypericaceae.

Species
Plants of the World Online currently includes:
 Harungana madagascariensis Lam. ex Poir.
 Harungana montana Spirlet
 Harungana rubescens (Oliv.) Byng & Christenh

Distribution and habitat
Harungana can be found in medium to low altitudes around 1000-1600m above sea level in evergreen forest, usually around the forest margins and along river banks. It is widely distributed from South Africa to Sudan. It is often the first plant to be found in a forest that has been cleared. It can be found in both forest and savanna regions. It is native to Central African Republic, Congo, Democratic Republic of Congo, Eswatini, Ethiopia, Kenya, Lesotho, Madagascar, Namibia, Sierra Leone, South Africa, Sudan, Tanzania, and Uganda.

Harungana is an introduced genus, naturalized and brought to the Harvey Creek, Babinda, and Mirriwinni areas of Australia. Harungana has now become quite common in disturbed coastal lowland rainforest and has the capacity to spread widely.

Uses
Harungana madagasacariensis can be used in various ways. For example, H. madagasacariensis is a source of firewood and is used in the production of charcoal. The tree is not used commercially because it rarely grows to merchantable size. However, people sometimes use the light wood to make poles for building houses.

The plant has red sap. Sap is used to treat scabies and anthelmintic (tapeworm). It is also used as a treatment for ringworm in Liberia. The leaves are used to control hemorrhages and diarrhoea, and as remedy for gonorrhea, sore throat, headaches and fevers. Flower stalks is rumored to ease colic and to check infection after childbirth. Decoction of the bark is used to treat malaria and jaundice. Roots are used to improve breast development in young women. Young leaves are sometimes used to treat asthma. In certain areas of Eastern Africa, people believe that fruits of H. madagasacariensis avert bleeding because of its red juice, so are used for abortion.

References

External links

 
Taxa named by Jean-Baptiste Lamarck
Malpighiales genera
Flora of Africa